Megaulacobothrus is a genus of grasshoppers in the tribe Stenobothrini.  Species have been recorded from northern and Temperate Asia.

Species 
The Orthoptera Species File lists:
Megaulacobothrus aethalinus Zubovski, 1899
Megaulacobothrus barbipes Zheng, Lin & Shi, 2012
Megaulacobothrus chinensis (Tarbinsky, 1927)
Megaulacobothrus ewenkensis Zheng, Lin & Shi, 2012
Megaulacobothrus flexivenus (Liu, 1981)
Megaulacobothrus fuscipennis Caudell, 1921 - type species (locality Zhejiang, China)
Megaulacobothrus fuscipennoides Ma, Zheng & Guo, 2000
Megaulacobothrus hunanensis Wei & Yin, 1986
Megaulacobothrus jejuensis Kim, 2008
Megaulacobothrus latipennis (Bolívar, 1898)
Megaulacobothrus liaoningensis Zheng, 1988
Megaulacobothrus longisonus Li & Yin, 1987
Megaulacobothrus maerkangensis Zheng, 1980
Megaulacobothrus minutus Zhang, 1990
Megaulacobothrus multipegus Wei & Yin, 1986
Megaulacobothrus rufitibis Zheng, 1989
Megaulacobothrus shenmuensis Zheng & Ren, 1993
Megaulacobothrus tianshanensis (Zheng, Ma & Ren, 2009)
Megaulacobothrus xiangchengensis Liu, 1985
Megaulacobothrus yuanshanensis Zheng, 1980

References

External links
 

Acrididae genera
Orthoptera of Asia 
Gomphocerinae